HMS Weymouth was a 60-gun fourth rate ship of the line of the Royal Navy, built at Plymouth Dockyard to the draught specified by the 1745 Establishment, and launched on 18 February 1752.

Weymouth served until 1772, when the decision was taken to have her broken up.

Notes

References

Lavery, Brian (2003) The Ship of the Line - Volume 1: The development of the battlefleet 1650-1850. Conway Maritime Press. .

Ships of the line of the Royal Navy
1752 ships